Skaklya Glacier is the  long and  wide glacier on the east side of the main crest of northern Sentinel Range in Ellsworth Mountains, Antarctica.  It is situated northwest of Zhenda Glacier and southeast of the head of Vidul Glacier.  The glacier drains the south slopes of Mount Reimer and the north slopes of Blenika Peak, flows east-northeastwards and together with Zhenda Glacier joins Sabazios Glacier west of Mount Lanning in Sostra Heights.

The glacier is named after Skaklya Waterfall in Western Bulgaria.

Location
US mapping in 1961.

See also
 List of glaciers in the Antarctic
 Glaciology

Maps
 Newcomer Glacier.  Scale 1:250 000 topographic map.  Reston, Virginia: US Geological Survey, 1961.
 Antarctic Digital Database (ADD). Scale 1:250000 topographic map of Antarctica. Scientific Committee on Antarctic Research (SCAR). Since 1993, regularly updated.

References
 Skaklya Glacier SCAR Composite Gazetteer of Antarctica
 Bulgarian Antarctic Gazetteer. Antarctic Place-names Commission. (details in Bulgarian, basic data in English)

External links
 Skaklya Glacier. Copernix satellite image

Glaciers of Ellsworth Land
Bulgaria and the Antarctic